Best Friends Forever? (or BFF) is an Indian teen drama which aired on Channel V India from 3 December 2012, to 25 May 2013. The show ran for a total of 140 episodes and is loosely based on the American show Pretty Little Liars.

Plot

Ela receives a delivery at Sanju's house. She is shocked to see the clutch she had lost on the night of Varun's disappearance in the delivery box. She finds a message in the clutch and shows it to Vinnie. They suspect Daljeet is behind the blackmail. Ela screams upon seeing Varun in the mock court. Ela runs out of the mock trial room after seeing Varun there again. She believes that he is alive. Vinnie tells her that it might be a ghost and reminds her of Varun's death. The scene begins when Varun jumps off a mountain on Valentine's night. Vinnie and Ela go in search of him. Varun hangs onto Ela's clutch to climb up the mountain, but they fail to save him. Daljeet talks to someone about his ploy against the girls.

Sanju, Ela, and Vinnie panic when Professor Anu claims that someone provoked Varun to commit suicide. Ela suspects a connection between Professor Anu and Varun, but Sanju disregards her suspicion. Varun and his sister, Professor Anu, discuss their ploy against the best friends for not saving Varun from the cliff and planting false evidence to mislead the police. Sanju and Ela become scared when there is a power outage at home. Vinnie and the boys surprise them with a party at Sanju's house. Varun sneaks into the washroom and scares Ela. Varun approaches Ela in the dark and confronts her for pushing him off the cliff. Ela and Vinnie argue. Ela receives a taunting message from Varun when everyone plays truth or dare, threatening to reveal the truth to Sanju if she does not confess how she had cheated in the exams. Sanju becomes upset upon learning that Ela had topped the exams by switching the answer papers with her. She tells Vinnie that she can never trust Ela again. She denies forgiving her. Professor Rigved expels Ela for cheating. Varun calls Ela. Vinnie attends the call. He uses voice changing software to speak to her. He tells Vinnie that he has kept evidence of their crime in Sanju's locker. Ela and Vinnie worry that Sanju will go to the police if she sees the proof. Vinnie goes to the locker room to get the evidence before Sanju sees it. Prithvi tells Sanju that she is the central piece holding their group together. He persuades her to join the gang in the canteen. They understand Sanju's situation and care for her. Sanju asks them not to affect their friendship with Ela because of what happened. Meanwhile, Vinnie and Ela panic when they see sketches of them standing on the cliff on Valentine's night in the envelope. Varun blackmails them and gives them two hours to get Rs. 10 lakh. Ela and Vinnie meet the mystery guy, who is Varun, at an isolated location. He records their confession of his murder by tricking them.

Varun asks for more money, asks them to meet him on the same cliff once again. Vinnie steals money from her mother's locker. Varun tries to kill them on the cliff when Sanju enters the scene while searching for Ela and Vinnie. She has seen their video message confessing to her. Sanju defends her best friends and says to Varun that he is still the bad guy. If he wants to kill them, he should kill her first. Varun hesitates and says he never wanted to kill them. Rather, he just wanted Ela and Vinnie to know how it feels to come near death. He then walks away. The BFF's are happy and head back to Sanju's home. Now, Varun is back in Westwood. Ela and Vinnie are planning Sanju's surprise birthday party. Sanju realizes that she is in love with Prithvi. All of Sanju's friends, as well as her small brother Sunny, also ignore Sanju. They choose Prithvi to bring Sanju to the party. Varun knows that the BFFs are planning something for Sanju's birthday. Varun calls Sanju and asks her to come with him for dinner and celebrate her birthday. Sanju tells Varun that if he comes to her house, she will call the police. As she cuts the call, somebody rings the bell of her house. Sanju thinks it to be Varun and takes a jug full of water as she opens the door. Not able to distinguish the person, she pours the jug forward onto the person revealed to be Prithvi. Prithvi comes inside the house and asks Sanju for her shirt to get it ironed. Prithvi asks Sanju to come with him for a pizza. Sanju goes to her room and gets ready to go. Prithvi takes her to a dark place. Sanju, being afraid, was going to leave the place but was stopped by the unexpected arrival of her friends. Somebody is now stalking Sanju and trying to hurt Prithvi. In the meantime, Vinnie's mother finds a boy to get Vinnie engaged. Vinnie's mother tells the name of the boy: Purushashtra. As Vinnie does not want to get engaged, Ela plans how to let that boy go. They invite the boy to a cafe where Ela pretends to be Vinnie. She pretends that Vinnie is an independent girl who has many boyfriends. However, Purushashtra (nicknamed Puru) identifies the real Vineeta Maheshwari. He slyly reminds them that he can also use the internet, telling her the real name of each of her friends. The trustees of the Westwood College arrange a party for Holi for the students. The stalker comes to the party and applies colour to Sanju. Prithvi follows the stalker and cuts his hand, but the stalker runs away. Prithvi leaves on the day of the Holi party. Mac also finally breaks up with Ela on the same day, now beginning to avoid Ela. A series of events make Sanju believe that Varun is the stalker, but he denies so.

In the meantime, Varun and Sanju stand in the election for the president of Westwood College of Law. On the evening of the same day, Vinnie drops Sanju at her house and finds that someone is hiding in the bushes. When they come near the bush, the man tries to run away but is finally caught by them. When the man shows his face, it is Rohan. Sanju thinks the stalker is, therefore, Rohan. Sanju and Varun make their own teams with three to four people who will help them stick posters across the college and write their speeches. Team members are naturally asked to vote for their respective leader. Sanju learns that Puru loves Vinnie. Thus, Sanju plans to tell Vinnie that Puru loves Chhaya, asking Vinnie to help set their love story. After pinning all of their posters across the college, everyone leaves to their respective homes. The next day, they arrive at the college, only to see that the stalker has written a love message on Sanju's posters. Sanju suspects the act to have been carried out by Rohan and tries to find him to no avail. In the evening, while Sanju was going to leave for her house after the day's college work, Ela and Vinnie wait for Sanju in the canteen. As she tries to leave, she finds that someone is following her. Afraid, Sanju tries to run but falls in the corridor. Hearing her screams, Vinnie and Ela come running and find Sanju lying in the corridor. They try to follow the stalker, who falls and gets hurt on his back. Despite the injury, he rides on a bike and gets away. The scared BFFs go to the police for help. The police arrest Rohan based on reports from the BFFs, finding that he has gotten hurt on his back. The next day, the Inspector calls Sanju as Varun arrives to post bail for Rohan. Varun tells them the time that Sanju told the police that Rohan was following her, revealing that at that particular time, Rohan was with Varun. On the same day, the BFFs follow Rohan going to an illegal bike racing course. When Sanju asks him why he was following her, he tells her that Prithvi told him to watch her, revealing that he loves Sanju very much. He tells them that Varun knew Rohan was involved in illegal bike racing, so he released Rohan from jail. Sanju asked him if Prithvi suspected Varun. Rohan answers that Prithvi had, but afterwards, Prithvi changed his suspect from Varun to somebody else. When Sanju asks who the new suspect is, a car hits Rohan at high speed. The BFFs take him to the hospital and call all of their friends, as well as Rohan's parents. After Rohan's operation, all of his friends, except Sanju and Varun, went to their respective homes. Sanju and Varun wait, but Rohan's parents do not arrive.

In the night, the stalker comes, warning Rohan about saying anything to Sanju. In the morning, Sanju finds many of her previously lost possessions lying on the girl's locker room bench. While she surveys the items and photos, an onlooker takes pictures, pinning the images on the school notice board. As a result of the photos, her professors believe her to be a cheater. Ela gets an SMS revealing the truth: that Sanju told Mac to behave ignore Ela. Knowing this, Ela ends her friendship with Sanju. Ela and Vinnie try to find RGV, and Sanju finds that RGV's laptop is lying on a classroom table. Sanju tries to make the laptop work, but college president voting automatically starts when she comes closer to the laptop. When she turns back, she sees the professor. Professor Rickved then calls everyone to the assembly hall for voting. After voting, Sanju and Sahil go to have coffee in the canteen. Meanwhile, Rohan calls Sanju and asks her to come to a discreet location to know the stalker's identity. Rohan waits for Sanju, but a car arrives. Rohan thought that car to be Sanju's, but he finds that it is the stalker as he tries to reach forward. The stalker is revealed as Sahil, and Sahil kills Rohan. When Sanju reaches the location, she finds Rohan hanged, and suicide notes that Sahil left. Varun helps the police in the investigation. Meanwhile, Anu learns that Sahil is the stalker and starts blackmailing him. While checking Rohan's diary, Sanjana is hit in the head by an unknown assailant and dragged to the garden. Vinnie and Puru find her unconscious and take her home. Rohan's dead body goes missing from the morgue. The next day, the police arrest Sanjana for stealing Rohan's body. Sanjana's father bails her out. Ela realizes her mistake and befriends Sanjana again. The same night, Vinnie's car has some problems. When she opens the car trunk, she finds Rohan's body, dumped by Sahil, based on the instructions of Professor Anu in a ploy to prove that Vinnie was also involved in Rohan's murder along with Sanju. Police trace Vinnie's car. Ela and Mac find out that Puru is also missing. Professor Rigved shows Sanju, Ela, and others a video in which a girl dressed up like Vinnie drags Rohan's body and places it in a car's dickey. Vinnie becomes a suspect for the crime, but Varun and Sanju prove Vinnie innocent by showing the entire college Puru and Vinnie's marriage video. Pammy admits that someone gave her the wig and dress to imitate Vinnie. They had told her she would need to do these things to be given an audition in an upcoming production. Later, it is revealed that Vinnie, upon finding Rohan's body in her dickey, fainted, but Puru found her, and they fled. According to Varun's instructions, they hand over Rohan's body to his parents. Sanju recollects and realizes that Rohan's autopsy report is within her books. They decide to inform the police. Ela, Pammy, and Vinnie are sent to the shooting area to inspect the area. There, they find a baseball bat with Varun's name written on it. Though Vinnie and Ela start pondering over it, Pammy says Varun is being framed, and they should stand by him. In the meantime, they find someone eavesdropping, and it is none other than the stalker, who once again escapes. Varun gets a call from Megha, and, to his utter dismay, Prithvi is in the last stage of his cancer. When Varun breaks this news to Pammy, Professor Anu hears it and texts Sanju, saying that Varun is playing a game with her by concealing information regarding Prithvi's supposedly declining health, only to have Sanju. Sanju is extremely guilty about distrusting Prithvi. She goes home with Ela and Vinnie but then tells them to leave her alone. Varun finds the person who took Pammy's auditions, but they realized that he is not the stalker when they interrogate them. Sanju's father comes across Sahil in her bedroom. Sanju's friends get a diary from the stalker, which Ela keeps. Sanju gets a letter from Prithvi confessing his love to Sanju. Prithvi asks that Sanju should forgive Varun as he is trying to rectify his mistakes. Sanju and Varun patch up, as Sanju is shown hugging Varun. Once ordered to leave class, she gets out, followed by Varun. They plan to eat dinner together, but Sanju drives with Sahil when he ardently requests time with her. Sahil insists Sanju keep driving further, and they eventually reach a place beautifully decorated where Sahil proposes to Sanjana. Mak and Ela are tensed as they did not find Sanju in her room, as she did not return home. Mac finds chewing gum in Sanju's room and notices a nearly identical one stuck inside the stalker's diary. He then realizes that Sahil is the stalker. Soon after, Puru and Vinnie find a laptop in the car which had hit Rohan. Varun then uses it to discover the stalker's hood in Sahil's locker. Sanju realizes that Sahil is the stalker when she switches her phone on as Ela sends a message to her regarding her security. Sanju gets confused and rushes out of place. She then finds Varun and Pammi on the road. Sanju goes with them. The BFFs hatch a plan to trap Sahil. Sanjana calls Sahil and tells him that she also loves him, telling him to meet her in the college. Sanjana's backside is shown (who is actually Pammy). She asks him why he killed Rohan. Infatuated, he tells her the truth, causing her to refuse to meet him at the college. Varun comes in the following scene. A fight then takes place between them, in which Sahil shoots Varun twice, causing Varun to fall. Sanjana comes with a camera, recording the fight in its entirety. Everyone at the crime scene watches as the police arrest Sahil. While leaving, he demonstrates that Professor Anu has been blackmailing by dialling her phone from the number he keeps receiving demands from. Thus, he blames her. At this point, however, everyone ignores him, thinking his words to be an insane outburst. Now, the BFFs set out to find the female blackmailer. Sanju meets Sahil in hospital. As he prepared to reveal the truth about Professor Anu, she enters a nurse's costume, forcing Sanjana to leave the room. She injects Sahil with poison, and Sahil gets paralyzed. Varun finds Rohan's bag and poison stored in Anu's room. He comes to realize that Anu is the blackmailer. He sends a message to all three girls through Pammy. The next day, everyone determines that Anu killed Rohan and poisoned Sahil. Frustrated, Anu reveals that she dumped Rohan's body in Vinnie's car in front of everyone. Sanjana records the entire confession, causing Anu to be arrested. The show leaps of two weeks (exams are over). Varun, Mac, and Puru cook food for the girls. Puru proposes to Vinnie for marriage. Mac and Ela promise to spend their life together. Sanju tells Varun that she is leaving for the US and will stay with Prithvi for his treatment. She also tells him that Pammy loves him very much. Hearing this, Varun states that he might patch up with Pammy. Someone is revealed to be still watching the group.

Cast

Main
 Fenil Umrigar as Sanjana "Sanju" Roy
 Charlie Chauhan as Elakshi "Ela" Singh
 Shritama Mukherjee as Vinita "Vinnie" Maheshwari
 Parth Samthaan as Prithvi Sanyal
 Yuvraj Thakur as Varun Mittal
 Rohit Suresh Saraf as Sahil
 Lavin Gothi as Makrand "Mak" Mahajan
 Nakul Roshan Sahdev as Purushastra Jajodiya, Vinnie's boyfriend

Recurring
 Abhilash Kumar as Rohan Sharma
 Rohit Saraf as Sahil Mehta, Sanju's friend/stalker
 Shravan Mehta as RGV Radhesham Gandharva Vasudevan, Ela, Sanju and Vinnie's classmate
 Imran Khan as Devashish Roy, Sanjana's father
 Khushboo Purohit as Pammi, Sanju, Ela, Vinnie, Varun and Mac's classmate
 Kishwer Merchant as Mandira Singh, Ela's mother
 Akash Maheshwari as Vinnie's brother
 Megha Chatterjee as Prof. Anu Shukla, Varun's sister, and Westwood Professor

References

External links
 

Indian television soap operas
2012 Indian television series debuts
2013 Indian television series endings
Indian teen drama television series
Channel V India original programming
Pretty Little Liars (franchise)
Indian television series based on American television series